Maureen Bauer is an American politician serving as a member of the Indiana House of Representatives from the 6th district. She assumed office on November 4, 2020.

Early life and education 
Bauer was born and raised in South Bend, Indiana, where she attended John Adams High School. She earned a Bachelor of Science degree in tourism, conventions, and event management from the School of Health and Human Sciences at Indiana University–Purdue University Indianapolis. Bauer later earned a certificate in wine education and management from the University of California, Los Angeles and an associate degree in viticulture and enology from Lake Michigan College.

Career 
Prior to entering politics, Bauer worked as a global accounts manager for HelmsBriscoe. She was elected to the Indiana House of Representatives in November 2020, succeeding her father, former Speaker B. Patrick Bauer. Bauer serves as the ranking member of the House Agriculture and Rural Development Committee.

References 

Living people
Year of birth missing (living people)
People from South Bend, Indiana
Indiana University–Purdue University Indianapolis alumni
Democratic Party members of the Indiana House of Representatives
Women state legislators in Indiana